Las Dos Naciones Cigar Factory is a historic building in Nogales, Arizona. It was built in 1899 by Maurice Stevens for the Las Dos Naciones Cigar Factory, and designed in the Colonial Revival and Greek Revival architectural styles. The company, co-founded by Bohemian immigrants Richard and Lewis Fleischer in 1897, was the only cigar factory in the Southwestern United States until it closed down in 1917. The building has been listed on the National Register of Historic Places since August 29, 1985.

References

Historic cigar factories
National Register of Historic Places in Santa Cruz County, Arizona
Colonial Revival architecture in Arizona
Greek Revival architecture in Arizona
Commercial buildings completed in 1899
1899 establishments in Arizona Territory